The FAO GM Foods Platform is a web platform where participating countries can share information on their assessments of the safety of genetically modified (recombinant-DNA) foods and feeds based on the Codex Alimentarius. It also allows for sharing of assessments of low-level GMO contamination (LLP, low-level presence).

The platform was set up by the Food and Agriculture Organization of the United Nations, and was launched at the FAO headquarters in Rome on 1 July 2013. The information uploaded to the platform is freely available to be read.

References

Agricultural organizations
Environmental organisations based in Italy
Food and Agriculture Organization
Food law
Food politics
Food safety
Food science
Information systems
International law